Nandyal district is a district in the Indian state of Andhra Pradesh.Nandyal as its administrative headquarters, it was formed on 4 April 2022 to become one of the resultant 26 districts and one of the district in Rayalaseema region. The district consists of Nandyal revenue division and a newly formed Dhone revenue division and Atmakur revenue division from Kurnool district.

Geography 
Nandyal district lies between the northern latitudes of 15° 27’ 49’’ and eastern longitudes of 78° 28’ 43’’. The altitude of the district varies from 100 ft above the mean sea level. This district is bounded on the north by Krishna rivers as well as Mahabubnagar district of Telangana State, on the south by Kadapa district and Anantapur Districts on the west by the Kurnool district and on the east by Prakasam District.

Etymology 
The district derived its name from its headquarters Nandyal.

Notable people 
 S. P. Y. Reddy, Member of Parliament and Industrialist
 Pendekanti Venkatasubbaiah,  Central Minister and Governor

Administrative divisions 

The district has three revenue divisions, namely Atmakur, Nandyal and Dhone, each headed by a sub collector. These revenue divisions are divided into 29 mandals. The district consists of 6 municipalities. Nandyal, Dhone, Atmakur, Allagadda, Bethamcherla and Nandikotkur are the six municipalities.

Mandals 

There are 10 mandals in Atmakur division, 14 mandals in Nandyal and 6 mandals in Dhone division. The 30 mandals under their revenue divisions are listed below:

Politics 

There are one parliamentary and six assembly constituencies in Nandyal district. The parliamentary constituencies are 
The assembly constituencies are

Demographics 

At the time of the 2011 census Nandyal district had a population of 1,781,777, of which 385,185 (21.62%) live in urban areas. Nandyal district has a sex ratio of 985 females per 1000 males. Scheduled Castes and Scheduled Tribes make up 322,825 (18.12%) and 52,784 (2.96%) of the population respectively.

At the time of the 2011 census, 81.08% of the population spoke Telugu and 17.25% Urdu as their first language.

Cities and towns

References

External links 

 
Districts of Andhra Pradesh
Rayalaseema
2022 establishments in Andhra Pradesh